Madhav Bhandari, (born 21 October 1954) is an Indian politician of Bharatiya Janata Party Maharashtra. He worked Full-timer for BJP in 1980–1990. Then promoted as Spokesperson & Media Chief of BJP in 1982–1985.

He is currently working as Chief Spokesperson of Bharatiya Janata Party, Maharashtra State unit.

Earlier life
Since childhood he joined RSS later he worked for ABVP in student life. He entered in Print Media from the days of Emergency in 1975. He was Additional Editor In Chief of Vivek (Mumbai).

Career
He represents the state of Maharashtra in the committee of BJP, chaired by President Raosaheb Dadarao Danve. He has served as the spokesperson of BJP from 2010 to the current date.

Positions held

Within BJP

Full-timer, BJP (1980–1990)
Spokesperson & Media Chief, BJP (1982–1985)
Organising Secretary, Kokan Division BJP (1980–1982 & 1985–1990)
President, Sindhudurg district, BJP (2003–2005)
Currently Chief Spokesperson, Maharashtra BJP

Legislative

Member, Konkan Housing and Area Development Board (1996–1998)
Vice President, Sindhudurg Zilla Parishad (1997–2001)
President, Sindhudurg Zilla Parishad (2001) Additional Charge

References

People from Sindhuli District
1954 births
Living people
Maharashtra district councillors
People from Sindhudurg district
Maharashtra politicians
Bharatiya Janata Party politicians from Maharashtra